Billy buttons may refer to one of several genera of daisies native to Australia:

 Craspedia
 Pycnosorus